Jin Akimoto (born April 7, 1971) is a retired Japanese mixed martial artist. He competed in the Bantamweight and Flyweight divisions. He spent the entirety of his career, barring one fight, in Shooto. Between 2000 and 2004 he was ranked as one of the best bantamweights in the world.

Personal life
Jin Akimoto was born in Sagamihara, in the Kanagawa Prefecture of Japan. He is the youngest of three siblings, with an older brother and sister. He graduated from Kanagawa Prefectural Yaei Higashi High School. He moved to Tokyo, where he graduated from Kyorin University. After retiring from martial arts, he pursued a career in politics, as well as opening his own gym.

Martial arts career
Akimoto made his debut in 1995 during Shooto - Vale Tudo Access 4 against Kazuyoshi Kudo, whom he beat by rear naked choke. He would achieve two more submission wins over Masataka Kawakami and Yoshinori Haraigawa.

He would then draw against Mitsuhiro Sakamoto. In a rematch he lost a majority decision. In his next fights he accumulated a 2-3-1 record, all decisions. His 5-3-2 record earned him a bantamweight title fight against Mamoru Yamaguchi. He lost a majority decision.

Bouncing back, he fought Yoshinobu Ota and won a unanimous decision and an armbar win against Greg Piper. In a rematch against Mamoru Yamaguchi during Shooto: R.E.A.D. Final he lost a unanimous decision.

Akimoto bounced back with unanimous decision wins over Hiroaki Yoshioka and Takeyasu Hirono, as well as a kneebar win over Alfonso Alcarez and a TKO win over Tomoyuki Tachi. 

He subsequently lost his next six fights He then drew twice against Junji Ikoma, and lost against Ryuichi Miki and Ayumu Shioda. Akimoto failed to win a single fight during this five year period, with a record of 0-8-2. He would retire on a win, beating Kenji Hosoya with a guillotine choke during Shooto: Gig Tokyo 4.

Mixed martial arts record

|-
| Win
| align=center| 12-13-4
| Kenji Hosoya
| Submission (guillotine choke)
| Shooto: Gig Tokyo 4
| 
| align=center| 1
| align=center| 2:46
| Shinjuku Face
| Tokyo, Japan
|-
| Loss
| align=center| 11-13-4
| Ayumu Shioda
| Decision (unanimous)
| Shooto: Shooto Tradition 5
| 
| align=center| 2
| align=center| 5:00
| Differ Ariake Arena
| Tokyo, Japan
|-
| Loss
| align=center| 11-12-4
| Ryuichi Miki
| Decision (majority)
| Shooto: Shooting Disco 6: Glory Shines In You
| 
| align=center| 3
| align=center| 5:00
| Shinjuku Face
| Tokyo, Japan
|-
| Draw
| align=center| 11-11-4
| Junji Ikoma
| Draw
| Shooto: Shooting Disco 5: Earth, Wind and Fighter
| 
| align=center| 3
| align=center| 5:00
| Shinjuku Face
| Tokyo, Japan
|-
| Draw
| align=center| 11-11-3
| Junji Ikoma
| Draw
| Shooto: Back To Our Roots 7
| 
| align=center| 3
| align=center| 5:00
| Korakuen Hall
| Tokyo, Japan
|-
| Loss
| align=center| 11-11-2
| Setsu Iguchi
| Decision (majority)
| Shooto: Back To Our Roots 5
| 
| align=center| 3
| align=center| 5:00
| Korakuen Hall
| Tokyo, Japan
|-
| Loss
| align=center| 11-10-2
| Tetsu Suzuki
| Decision (unanimous)
| Shooto: Rookie Tournament Final
| 
| align=center| 2
| align=center| 5:00
| Shinjuku Face
| Tokyo, Japan
|-
| Loss
| align=center| 11-9-2
| Masahiro Oishi
| Technical Submission (armbar)
| Shooto 2005: 7/30 in Korakuen Hall
| 
| align=center| 1
| align=center| 3:14
| Korakuen Hall
| Tokyo, Japan
|-
| Loss
| align=center| 11-8-2
| Kenji Osawa
| Decision (majority)
| Shooto: 5/4 in Korakuen Hall
| 
| align=center| 2
| align=center| 5:00
| Korakuen Hall
| Tokyo, Japan
|-
| Loss
| align=center| 11-7-2
| Marcos Galvao
| Decision (unanimous)
| Shooto: 9/26 in Kourakuen Hall
| 
| align=center| 3
| align=center| 5:00
| Korakuen Hall
| Tokyo, Japan
|-
| Loss
| align=center| 11-6-2
| Kentaro Imaizumi
| Decision (unanimous)
| Shooto 2004: 5/3 in Korakuen Hall
| 
| align=center| 3
| align=center| 5:00
| Korakuen Hall
| Tokyo, Japan
|-
| Win
| align=center| 11-5-2
| Tomoyuki Tachi
| TKO (punches)
| Kingdom Ehrgeiz: Tokyo University Flight
| 
| align=center| 1
| align=center| 2:41
| Excitement Space Z-Zone
| Tokyo, Japan
|-
| Win
| align=center| 10-5-2
| Alfonso Alcarez
| Submission (kneebar)
| Shooto: Treasure Hunt 6
| 
| align=center| 1
| align=center| 0:22
| Korakuen Hall
| Tokyo, Japan
|-
| Win
| align=center| 9-5-2
| Takeyasu Hirono
| Decision (unanimous)
| Shooto: To The Top 8
| 
| align=center| 3
| align=center| 5:00
| Korakuen Hall
| Tokyo, Japan
|-
| Win
| align=center| 8-5-2
| Hiroaki Yoshioka
| Decision (unanimous)
| Shooto: To The Top 3
| 
| align=center| 3
| align=center| 5:00
| Kitazawa Town Hall
| Setagaya, Tokyo, Japan
|-
| Loss
| align=center| 7-5-2
| Mamoru Yamaguchi
| Decision (unanimous)
| Shooto: R.E.A.D. Final
| 
| align=center| 3
| align=center| 5:00
| Tokyo Bay NK Hall
| Urayasu, Chiba, Japan
|-
| Win
| align=center| 7-4-2
| Greg Piper
| Submission (armbar)
| Shooto: R.E.A.D. 4
| 
| align=center| 1
| align=center| 2:29
| Kitazawa Town Hall
| Setagaya, Tokyo, Japan
|-
| Win
| align=center| 6-4-2
| Yoshinobu Ota
| Decision (unanimous)
| Shooto: Gateway to the Extremes
| 
| align=center| 2
| align=center| 5:00
| Kitazawa Town Hall
| Setagaya, Tokyo, Japan
|-
| Loss
| align=center| 5-4-2
| Mamoru Yamaguchi
| Decision (majority)
| Shooto: Renaxis 4
| 
| align=center| 2
| align=center| 5:00
| Korakuen Hall
| Tokyo, Japan
|-
| Draw
| align=center| 5-3-2
| Takeyasu Hirono
| Draw
| Shooto: Gig '99
| 
| align=center| 2
| align=center| 5:00
| Kitazawa Town Hall
| Tokyo, Japan
|-
| Win
| align=center| 5-3-1
| Masaru Gokita
| Decision (majority)
| Shooto: Las Grandes Viajes 5
| 
| align=center| 2
| align=center| 5:00
| Korakuen Hall
| Tokyo, Japan
|-
| Loss
| align=center| 4-3-1
| Hisao Ikeda
| Decision (unanimous)
| Shooto: Las Grandes Viajes 1
| 
| align=center| 3
| align=center| 5:00
| Korakuen Hall
| Tokyo, Japan
|-
| Loss
| align=center| 4-2-1
| Kimihito Nonaka
| Decision (majority)
| Shooto: Reconquista 3
| 
| align=center| 2
| align=center| 5:00
| Korakuen Hall
| Tokyo, Japan
|-
| Win
| align=center| 4-1-1
| Hisao Ikeda
| Decision (majority)
| Shooto: Reconquista 1
| 
| align=center| 3
| align=center| 3:00
| Korakuen Hall
| Tokyo, Japan
|-
| Loss
| align=center| 3-1-1
| Mitsuhiro Sakamoto
| Decision (majority)
| Shooto: Let's Get Lost
| 
| align=center| 3
| align=center| 3:00
| Korakuen Hall
| Tokyo, Japan
|-
| Draw
| align=center| 3-0-1
| Mitsuhiro Sakamoto
| Draw
| Shooto: Vale Tudo Junction 3
| 
| align=center| 3
| align=center| 3:00
| Korakuen Hall
| Tokyo, Japan
|-
| Win
| align=center| 3-0
| Yoshinori Haraigawa
| Technical Submission (rear-naked choke)
| Shooto: Vale Tudo Junction 2
| 
| align=center| 1
| align=center| 1:42
| Korakuen Hall
| Tokyo, Japan
|-
| Win
| align=center| 2-0
| Masataka Kawakami
| Submission (rear naked choke)
| Shooto: Yokohama Free Fight
| 
| align=center| 1
| align=center| 2:32
| 
| Japan
|-
| Win
| align=center| 1-0
| Kazuyoshi Kudo
| Submission (rear naked choke)
| Shooto: Vale Tudo Access 4
| 
| align=center| 1
| align=center| 0:56
| 
| Japan

See also
List of male mixed martial artists

References

External links
 
 Jin Akimoto at mixedmartialarts.com
 Jin Akimoto at fightmatrix.com

1971 births
Japanese male mixed martial artists
Bantamweight mixed martial artists
Flyweight mixed martial artists
Living people